Bruno Zanoni (born 29 July 1952) is an Italian racing cyclist. He won stage 11 of the 1978 Giro d'Italia.

References

External links
 

1952 births
Living people
Italian male cyclists
Italian Giro d'Italia stage winners
Cyclists from the Province of Bergamo